The precise number of websites blocked in Belgium is unknown. Blocking may vary from one Internet Service Provider (ISP) to another with some sites blocked by some ISPs and not by others.

Site blocks in Belgium are at this moment based on DNS Hijacking which has the possibilities of circumventing using proxies or DNS over HTTPS. Blocked websites are redirected to a multilingual StopPage

Verification 

There is no official complete register of blocked sites. Blocked content includes:
 Court orders (mainly for copyright issues) 
 Unilateral blocking (some websites have been reported as being blocked without any known court order on the sole initiative of certain ISPs)
 Gambling regulations (Belgian gambling laws requires a Gambling business to have a local physical gambling point and proper license in order to provide online gambling)

Court-ordered blocked websites 
These are the sites explicitly listed and blocked by court cases in Belgium.

Notes

Unilaterally blocked websites 
These are the sites blocked by some ISPs in Belgium without any known related court-order. It is believed that these blockings are the result of pressure by the Belgian Anti-piracy Federation (BAF) who threatened ISPs with heavy legal fees should they not comply with their request. The list of ISPs below is probably incomplete as each ISP can decide individually on the matter.

EU-ordered blocked websites 
These are the sites blocked because of EU mandates.

Gambling regulations blocked websites 
The list of blocked gambling websites is the only official publicly available and maintained blocklist in Belgium. The list is available on the official Belgian Gaming Commission website.

References

External links
 Gaming Commission
 the StopPage
 anti-piracy.be

Internet censorship in Belgium
Belgium
Belgium communications-related lists
Blocked,Belgium